The boondocks is an American expression from the Tagalog (Filipino) word bundók ("mountain"). It originally referred to a remote rural area, but now, is often applied to an out-of-the-way area considered backward and unsophisticated by city-folk. It can also occasionally refer to a mountain in both Filipino and American context.

Origins
The expression was introduced to English by U.S. military personnel fighting in the Philippine–American War (1899-1902). It derives from the Tagalog word "bundók", which means "mountain". According to military historian Paul A. Kramer, the term originally had "connotations of bewilderment and confusion", due to the guerrilla warfare in which the soldiers were engaged.

In the Philippines, the word bundók is also a colloquialism referring to rural inland areas, which are usually mountainous and difficult to access, as most major cities and settlements in the Philippines are located in lowlands or near the coastline. Equivalent terms include the Spanish-derived probinsiya ("province") and the Cebuano term bukid ("mountain"). When used generally, the term refers to a mountainous area with a connotation of being rustic or uncivilized.

Expanded meanings
The term evolved into American slang to refer to the countryside or isolated rural/wilderness area, regardless of topography or vegetation. Similar slang or colloquial words are "the sticks", "the wops", "the backblocks", or "Woop Woop" in Australia, "the wop-wops" in New Zealand, "bundu" in South Africa (unrelated to "boondocks" or "bundok"), "out in the weeds" in New Brunswick and "out in the tules" in California. The diminutive "boonies" can be heard in films about the Vietnam War such as Brian De Palma's Casualties of War (1989) used by American soldiers to designate rural areas of Vietnam.

Boondocking refers to camping with a recreational vehicle (RV) in a remote location without the electricity, water, or sewer infrastructure that is available at campgrounds or RV parks.

In African-American culture, the  word "boondocks" refers to all-white towns and cities that are  isolated from primarily African-American urban life.

In popular culture

Down in the Boondocks is the second studio album by Billy Joe Royal, and a hit song, both released in 1965.
 Little Big Town released a song on their 2005 album The Road to Here.
 The Boondocks an adult animated sitcom.

See also
 Hillbilly
 Hinterland
 Jíbaro
 Middle of nowhere
 Podunk
 Waikikamukau
 Yokel

Notes

References

Pejorative terms
Rural culture in the United States
Rural geography
Stereotypes of rural people
Tagalog words and phrases